The Las Brisas Mohawk is an American homebuilt aircraft that was designed and produced by Las Brisas Sales of Ozark, Missouri. When it was available the aircraft was supplied in the form of plans for amateur construction.

Design and development
Based upon the Avid Flyer, which it greatly resembles, the Mohawk features a strut-braced high wing, a two-seats-in-side-by-side configuration enclosed cockpit accessed via doors, fixed conventional landing gear and a single engine in tractor configuration.

The aircraft is made from metal tubing, with its flying surfaces and fuselage covered doped aircraft fabric. The plans specify standard hydraulic brakes, a steerable tailwheel and wings that fold for ground transport or storage.

The manufacturer estimates the construction time from the supplied plans as 900 hours. In 1998 the designer indicated that the aircraft could be completed for US$6,500 excluding labor.

Specifications (Mohawk)

References

Mohawk
1990s United States sport aircraft
1990s United States ultralight aircraft
1990s United States civil utility aircraft
Single-engined tractor aircraft
High-wing aircraft
Homebuilt aircraft